St Brendan's Community School is a secondary school located in the town of Birr, County Offaly in the midlands of Ireland. The school was opened in January 1980 following an amalgamation of the following schools that were in operation around the town; Presentation College (Oxmantown Mall), Mercy Sisters Convent (Wilmer Road) and the Vocational School (Green St). The first principal of the school was Brother Denis, who remained in that position until 1998, when he was succeeded by Tom Foley. The school has a strong hurling tradition, and has produced many hurlers (including Brian Whelahan) who have won All-Ireland titles at both club and county level. The school draws pupils from across South Offaly and North Tipperary. The school's architecture has previously been compared to a "tractor shed".

References

External links
St Brendan's Community School, Birr

1980 establishments in Ireland
Buildings and structures in Birr, County Offaly
Community schools in the Republic of Ireland
Educational institutions established in 1980
Secondary schools in County Offaly